Chinese indigo may refer to:

 Isatis indigotica, a kind of woad
 Indigofera amblyantha, a kind of indigo plant, in the family Fabaceae
 Indigofera decora, a kind of indigo plant, also known as summer wisteria
 Persicaria tinctoria, a species of flowering plant in the buckwheat family
 Indigo naturalis

See also
 Indigo (disambiguation)
 Han purple and Han blue, pigments developed in ancient China
 Indirubin, a chemical component of indigo used in traditional Chinese medicine
 INDIGO, Beijing, a mixed-use development in Beijing, China
 Lactarius indigo, an edible mushroom sold in  China, Guatemala, and Mexico
 Realgar/Indigo naturalis, a medication used in China to treat leukemia
 Indigo naturalis